The Asian American Hotel Owners Association (AAHOA) is a trade association that represents hotel owners. As of 2022, AAHOA has approximately 20,000 members who own about 50% of the hotels in the United States. AAHOA provides service and support for hoteliers through its educational offerings, policy and political advocacy for the interests of hotel owners, opportunities for professional development, and community engagement.

Indian Americans in the hotel and motel industry early on faced discrimination, both from the insurance industry and from competitors placing "American owned" signs outside their properties to take business from them. In 1985, a group was formed in Tennessee, the Midsouth Indemnity Association, which then grew nationwide and changed its name to the Indo American Hospitality Association.
Another group of Indian hoteliers was created in Atlanta in 1989 to address discrimination issues and increase awareness of Asian Americans working in the hospitality industry under the name Asian American Hotel Owners Association. In 1994, the organizations merged in order to work more efficiently to defend Asian hotel owners’ interests throughout the United States.

The association's current President & CEO, appointed in May 2022, is Laura Lee Blake. A highly accomplished attorney with more than 25 years of experience, Blake most recently served as a partner at Connor, Fletcher, and Hedenkamp LLP in Irvine, California. Blake brings decades of experience in the fields of law, government, business, and academia to AAHOA.

Blake previously worked for AAHOA for nearly 10 years, from 2005 to 2014, as General Counsel & Vice President of Fair Franchising and Government Affairs.

AAHOA History 
The story of AAHOA is the story of Indian Americans pursuing – and achieving – the American Dream. It is a story of immigrants who came to the United States with only a suitcase and the hope for a better life. Asians have a rich tradition of entrepreneurship, self-improvement, and family values. After India's independence in 1947, many of that country's young people immigrated to the United States to pursue their education and "the American Dream." They became “accidental hoteliers” – men and women educated for other professions in another country who now embraced hospitality as one of the best ways to earn a living in their adopted homeland.

Many of these new immigrants arrived in America with backgrounds as entrepreneurs and business owners. During the 1970s, Indian Americans saw tremendous opportunities for prosperity in the hospitality industry, and many began to save their money in order to purchase hotels. Word quickly spread throughout the community about the potential of the hotel industry as a niche market, and the Indian American influence in hospitality began.

With a can-do attitude, a willingness to take risk, and a desire to take control of their own destiny, Indian American hotel owners succeeded – many of them perhaps beyond their own expectations. They succeeded as smart business owners and they succeeded as good citizens, all while respecting and maintaining their heritage as well as culture.

These new hoteliers faced discrimination within the industry, particularly from banks and insurance companies. To overcome these obstacles, hoteliers collaborated to form various groups, culminating in the creation of the Asian American Hotel Owners Association (AAHOA) in 1989.

Today, AAHOA members own 60% of all hotels in the United States. Many of the original “accidental hoteliers” have passed the baton to their U.S.-educated children. These second-generation and third-generation of sophisticated, professional hotel owners and developers are positioned to build on the foundation established by their immigrant parents.

Oxford Economics Study: AAHOA Ownership and Impact

Our more than 34,000 member-owned hotels with more than 1 million employees represent a significant part of the U.S. economy. 
To quantify these important impacts, AAHOA engaged Oxford Economics, an international leader in global forecasting and quantitative analysis, to conduct a comprehensive economic impact analysis.

The study analyzed the share of U.S. hotels and rooms owned by AAHOA Members, hotel operations, hotel guest ancillary spending, capital investment, and indirect and induced impacts supported by AAHOA hotels in other parts of the U.S. economy – on both the national and state-by-state levels.

Some of the key findings are as follows:

 60% of U.S. hotels are owned by AAHOA Members
 1.1 million employees worked at member-owned hotels, earning $47 billion annually
 3.5 million guests stay at member-owned hotels each night, filling all 30 NFL stadiums and all 31 MLB stadiums combined
 1.7% contribution to the U.S. GDP
 4.2 million U.S. jobs supported by member-owned hotels

The full study can be found here.

AAHOACON 
AAHOA is known for its annual convention and trade show, AAHOACON, which has been described as "the Super Bowl of the Hospitality Industry." The annual convention takes place at a different location in the U.S. each year, and draws thousands of attendees from all over the country. It is the nation's largest event exclusively for hotel owners, and guest speakers have included well-known industry professionals, public speakers, professional athletes, and government officials.

Geoff Ballotti, President & CEO of Wyndham Hotels & Resorts, said this in reference to AAHOACON: “There is no annual conference that more of us from Wyndham Hotels & Resorts attend than AAHOACON. We look forward to getting together in-person again, as we continue to work as an industry to navigate the recovery, restore profitability, and build a better path forward in a post-COVID world.”

See also
Confederation of Tourism and Hospitality

References

External links
http://www.aahoa.com
http://www.aahoa.com/AM/Template.cfm?Section=About_Us
https://web.archive.org/web/20100130170403/http://www.lodgingoperator.com/aahoa_org.shtml

Trade associations based in the United States
Hospitality industry organizations
Asian-American organizations
1989 establishments in Georgia (U.S. state)
Organizations based in Atlanta